Michael Cranford (born June 5, 1963) is a video game designer and programmer. As a designer and programmer his works include The Bard's Tale, The Bard's Tale II, and Dark Seed. Cranford left the video game industry in 1992 to pursue an academic career as an ethicist.

Game designer 
Cranford was the designer and programmer of 1985's The Bard's Tale and 1986's The Bard's Tale II: The Destiny Knight role-playing video games published by Interplay Productions. He also programmed the Apple II version of Donkey Kong, the Commodore 64 version of Super Zaxxon, as well as Maze Master (a spiritual predecessor of The Bard's Tale). His last video game was Dark Seed for Cyberdreams in 1992. He left the video game industry to pursue graduate studies, and thus was not involved in the creation of 1988's The Bard's Tale III. Almost thirty years later, however, he was approached by inXile Entertainment to assist with the development of The Bard's Tale IV and had agreed to provide feedback and advice for the new game.

Games

Academic career 
He was a professor for eight years at Biola University in La Mirada, California, gaining his Master of Divinity degree from Biola and a master's degree in Social Ethics from the University of Southern California. He is currently an Adjunct Professor of Philosophy at Concordia University in Irvine, California. He studied architecture at the University of California at Berkeley and he holds a degree in philosophy from the University of California, and has completed a Ph.D. in Religion and Social Ethics from the University of Southern California, with a focus on ethics and technology.

Publications 
 
 
 
 
  Reprinted in

References

External links

The Bard's Tale Compendium - more information about Michael Cranford's popular game series

1963 births
American ethicists
American video game designers
American video game programmers
Biola University alumni
Biola University faculty
Interplay Entertainment people
Living people
People from Orange, California
People from San Clemente, California
UC Berkeley College of Environmental Design alumni
University of Southern California alumni